The Gay Oil Company Building, is a historic commercial building at 300 South Broadway Street in Little Rock, Arkansas.  It is a two-story brick building with Classical Revival styling.  It was built in 1925 for Thomas Gay, founder of the Gay Oil Company, Little Rock's first oil company.  The company's rise from its founding in 1907 mirrored the rise of the automobile as an important means of transportation.

The building was listed on the National Register of Historic Places in 2017.

See also
National Register of Historic Places listings in Little Rock, Arkansas

References

Industrial buildings and structures on the National Register of Historic Places in Arkansas
Buildings and structures completed in 1925
National Register of Historic Places in Little Rock, Arkansas
1925 establishments in Arkansas
Petroleum in Arkansas